Federal Route 221, consisting of Jalan Thean Teik (Thean Teik Road) and Lebuhraya Thean Teik (Thean Teik Avenue) (formerly Penang State Route P212), is a federal road in Penang, Malaysia.

Features

At most sections, the Federal Route 221 was built under the JKR R5 road standard, allowing maximum speed limit of up to 90 km/h.

List of junctions

References

Malaysian Federal Roads